Olingen is a small town in the commune of Betzdorf, in eastern Luxembourg.  , the town has a population of 380. The comune of Betzdorf is one of the richest in Luxembourg and has many expensive and stylish properties.

References

Betzdorf, Luxembourg
Towns in Luxembourg